Pizz Gallagiun (also known as Pizzo Galleggione) is a mountain of the Oberhalbstein Range, located on the border between Italy and Switzerland. On its southern side it overlooks the Val Bregaglia. On its northern side it overlooks the Val Madris.

References

External links
 Pizz Gallagiun on Hikr

Mountains of the Alps
Alpine three-thousanders
Mountains of Graubünden
Mountains of Lombardy
Italy–Switzerland border
International mountains of Europe
Mountains of Switzerland
Bregaglia